AK Steel Holdings Corporation was a steelmaking company headquartered in West Chester Township, Butler County, Ohio. The company, whose name was derived from the initials of Armco, its predecessor company, and Kawasaki Steel Corporation, was acquired by Cleveland-Cliffs in 2020.

AK Steel operated eight steel plants and two tube manufacturing plants in Ashland, Kentucky; Butler, Pennsylvania; Coshocton, Ohio; Dearborn, Michigan; Mansfield, Ohio; Middletown, Ohio; Rockport, Indiana; and Zanesville, Ohio.  The company had manufacturing operations in the United States, Canada and Mexico, and facilities in Western Europe. AK Steel produced flat-rolled carbon, stainless and electrical steel products, primarily for the automotive, infrastructure and manufacturing sectors, including electrical power, and distributors and converters markets. The company also provided carbon and stainless steel tubing products, die design and tooling, and hot- and cold-stamped components. Of AK Steel's 2018 sales, 63% went to the automotive industry, 15% to infrastructure and manufacturing industry and 22% to distributors and converters.

The company was criticized for its record regarding pollution and worker safety.

In 2019, AK Steel was named GM Supplier of the Year for Non Fabricated Steel by General Motors for the second consecutive year.  AK Steel was also presented with a Smart Pillar Award from Ford, as a top-performing global supplier at the 21st annual Ford World Excellence Awards.

History
The company was founded in 1899 as The American Rolling Mill Company (ARMCO) in Middletown, Ohio, where it operated a production facility. George Matthew Verity (1865–1942) was a founder and its first president.

In 1922, it opened a second production facility, Ashland Works in Ashland, Kentucky.

In 1971, Armco Steel purchased Kansas City-based engineering firm Burns & McDonnell; however, in 1985, employees of Burns & McDonnell secured a loan to buy the company from Armco. In 1978, Armco Steel was renamed Armco, Inc. It moved its headquarters to New Jersey in 1985.

In 1982, a recession threatened the U.S. steel industry. Several of the nation’s steel companies reported losses for the first half of the year, while other companies, like Armco, were barely breaking even. In 1989, it entered into a limited partnership with Kawasaki Steel Corporation, which contributed several of its production facilities to the company.

While the company achieved over $1 billion in annual sales in the early 1990s, it was not profitable. The company then hired the 65 year old Tom Graham and Richard M. Wardrop, Jr. to improve its finances. These executives divested unprofitable operations and replaced most of the company's executives and managers. In 1993, the company moved its headquarters to Pittsburgh, Pennsylvania and renamed itself AK Steel Holdings reflecting its Armco roots and sizable investment by Kawasaki. The same year, the company sold the Kansas City Bolt and Nut Company plant to Bain Capital to avoid its shutdown. In March 1994, the company became a public company via an initial public offering, using the proceeds to pay down its unmanageable debt load. In 1995, the company moved its headquarters back to Middletown. In 1996, Graham made the decision to spend $1.1 billion to construct a new steel production facility in Rockport, Indiana. Rifts with its unions and its safety record, including 10 fatalities at its plants in 4 years, resulted in fines and scrutiny from the Occupational Safety and Health Administration (OSHA) ih 1996 as well. In 1999, the company acquired Armco Inc., its former parent company, for $1.3 billion. There was a lock-out at the Mansfield, Ohio plant after a disagreement on a three-year labor contract with 620 USWA employees.

In 2003, the bitter labor dispute in Mansfield ended, the union workers returning to work alongside those who'd replaced them. In 2006, there was another lockout of 2,700 workers in Middletown, Ohio about another contract renewal. In 2007, the company moved its headquarters to West Chester Township, Butler County, Ohio.

In 2014, the company acquired steel-making assets, including a coke-making facility and interests in 3 joint ventures that process flat-rolled steel products in Dearborn, Michigan, from Severstal for $700 million. In August 2017, the company acquired Precision Partners Holding Company for $360 million.

On March 13, 2020, the company was acquired by Cleveland-Cliffs for $1.1 billion.

Inclusion in the S&P 500 (2008–2011)
In 2008, the company was added to the S&P 500. In 2011, it was removed from the S&P 500 and added to the S&P 600.

In popular culture
The 2016 bestselling book, Hillbilly Elegy, focuses on life in Middletown, Ohio and makes many references to the town's dependence on AK Steel's Middletown Works facility.

Legal record

Environmental record

On June 27, 2000, the United States Environmental Protection Agency (EPA) issued an Emergency Order pursuant to the Safe Drinking Water Act, Clean Air Act and the Clean Water Act to AK Steel's Butler Works in Butler, Pennsylvania concerning the nitrate/nitrite compounds being released into the Connoquenessing Creek, an occasional water source for the Borough of Zelienople, alleging that AK Steel had failed to properly dispose of hexavalent chromium. The issue was settled in 2004, with AK Steel agreeing to pay a total of $1.2 million.

In 2006, AK Steel reached a settlement to compensate for polychlorinated biphenyl (PCB) contamination in Middletown, Ohio. The settlement included cleanup work estimated to cost $12–13 million.

AK Steel was listed #1 on the Mother Jones Top 20 polluters of 2010; dumping over 12,000 tons of toxic chemicals into Ohio waterways.

Based on 2014 data, the Political Economy Research Institute ranked AK Steel 53rd among corporations emitting airborne pollutants in the United States. The ranking is based on the quantity (343,000 pounds) and toxicity of the emissions. At the same time, it scored well in terms of environmental justice, affecting smaller percentages of the poor and minorities than their respective percentages of the total population.

In early 2015, the EPA listed the Ohio River as the most contaminated body of water in the U.S. According to the EPA's Annual Toxics Release Inventory, of the 23 million pounds of chemicals discharged into the river in 2013, more than 70 percent came from AK Steel.

In 2018, AK Steel had an air and water compliance rate of over 99.99%.

Middletown Works lockout
Armco and the Armco Employees Independent Federation (AEIF; a labor union) had a collective bargaining agreement in place in 2004 that required AK Steel to employ 3,114 workers, a "minimum base force guarantee". The agreement also authorized AK Steel to suspend the minimum number. On January 13, 2004, AK Steel informed the AEIF that it was suspending the minimum. The union then filed a grievance contesting the suspension. An arbitrator upheld the decision by AK Steel on July 1, 2004, subject to certain limitations, through at least May 10, 2005. The union sought and was granted a new hearing, and on July 1, 2005 the arbitrator issued a comprise total workforce. As part of the agreement the arbitrator allowed AK Steel to set aside financial payments to a fund, in lieu of hiring to the minimum, the amount of which was set by the arbitrator on October 7, 2005. On September 29, 2005, the AEIF filed a lawsuit against AK Steel in the United States District Court for the Southern District of Ohio (AEIF v. AK Steel Corp.; Case No. 1:05-CV-639), in which the AEIF sought to vacate that portion of the July 1, 2005 Award. AK Steel answered the complaint and filed counterclaims (AK Steel Corp. v. AEIF, Case No. 1:05-CV-531) on November 2, 2005.

On March 1, 2006, AK Steel began a lockout of about 2,700 workers at the Middletown Works plant in Middletown, Ohio. By the next day, the mill was operated by 1,800 salaried and temporary replacement workers.

On July 27, 2006, the AEIF affiliated with the International Association of Machinists and Aerospace Workers. In late October, AK offered a so-called final contract, which was rejected by the union by a vote of 2 to 1. 

One year after the lockout started, on February 28, 2007, AK Steel reached an agreement with the labor union. 

The union members ratified the proposed contract on March 14, 2007.

As part of the agreement, the AEIF and AK Steel reached a joint settlement of their 5 counter lawsuits, with AK Steel paying $7,702,301. A third of the amount was for profit sharing, a third for an assistance fund for employee benefits of employees not recalled to work, and a third an escrow account to settle employee disputes and claims as a result of the lockout. The Employment Security Plan and the Trade and Craft Quota and Service/Support Group Quota (the "minimum base force guarantees") were completely terminated.

This lockout was the longest labor stalemate in the 105-year history of the Middletown Works. The previous longest stalemate had been a six-day company lockout in 1986. Prior to that lockout, Armco's Middletown works never lost one minute of production due to a labor issue.

Pittsburgh Logistics Systems Lawsuit
In late 2016, AK Steel notified Pittsburgh Logistics Systems, Inc. (D/b/a PLS Logistics), a company which had been managing all of AK's truck dispatch and rail operations since 1995, that it was being replaced by Ryder as of January 18, 2017. At the time, AK Steel constituted 32% of the PLS' revenue base, according to court filings. PLS battled both Ryder and AK Steel in the United States District Court for the Southern District of Ohio, arguing that Ryder should not be able to use the list of trucking companies that PLS had used while servicing AK. However, U.S. District Court Judge Michael R. Barrett rejected PLS's contention and cleared Ryder and AK to proceed with the use of these carriers.

Historical Films

  The Romance of Iron and Steel (1938) is a 21-minute, black and white film sponsored by the American Rolling Mill Company (ARMCO). The title of the film comes from a theme of the steel exhibit at the Great Lakes Exposition held in Cleveland, Ohio in 1936-37. The film opens with an overview of the ARMCO Research Lab followed by a series of tracking shots taken from overhead cranes in an ARMCO plant that offer a unique perspective into the process of making rolled steel. George M. Verity, ARMCO founder, ends the film with a message about “ARMCO men” and the company culture.

Making Steel is a 47-minute film made in the mid-1990s. Introduced by CEO Richard M. Wardrop, Jr., who introduces himself as "Dick" Wardrop, it tells the story of the manufacture of steel in the AK Steel plants.

See also
 List of steel producers

References

External links

Companies formerly listed on the New York Stock Exchange
American companies established in 1899
Manufacturing companies established in 1899
Manufacturing companies based in Ohio
Buildings and structures in Butler County, Ohio
Former components of the Dow Jones Industrial Average
Superfund sites in Ohio
Itochu
1899 establishments in Ohio
1994 initial public offerings
2020 mergers and acquisitions
American corporate subsidiaries